The Donna Summer Special is a 1980 musical television special starring singer Donna Summer.

Overview
A variety television special that showcased the musical talents of singer and actress Donna Summer.

References

External links

1980 television specials
1980s American television specials
Donna Summer
Music television specials
Disco films
American Broadcasting Company television specials